Silesian Zoological Garden is a zoological garden in Poland. It was founded in 1954 and is situated in the Katowice and Chorzów districts of Silesia. It covers over 47.6 ha within the Silesian Central Park.

The Silesian zoo is a home for about 2,500 animals of 300 species. It is visited by over 390,000 people annually.

A mini-zoo is the collection of gentler animals which are (directly) accessible to children.

The dinosaur valley contains a full-scale reconstruction of 16 large dinosaurs, the remains of which were found by a Polish expedition to the Gobi desert.

External links
 Website Silesian Zoological Garden

Zoos in Poland
Buildings and structures in Katowice
Buildings and structures in Chorzów
Tourist attractions in Silesian Voivodeship
Zoos established in 1954
1954 establishments in Poland
Articles needing infobox zoo
Tourist attractions in Katowice